FMD may refer to:

Biology and medicine 
 Fibromuscular dysplasia, a medical condition
 Fig mosaic disease, a viral disease of fig plants
 Foot-and-mouth disease, a viral disease of ungulates
 Flow-mediated dilation, a physiological response, and medically diagnostic tool

Other 
 Falsified Medicines Directive, a European legal framework
 Fashion Model Directory, an online database
 Fluorescent Multilayer Disc, a disc format
 Fort Madison station (disambiguation), Iowa, United States
 Fyodor Mikhailovich Dostoyevsky, a Russian writer (1821–1881)